The Bay-class minesweepers, also known as the Gaspé-class minesweepers, were a class of minesweepers operated by the Royal Canadian Navy (RCN) and Canadian Forces (CF) during the Cold War. Their design was similar to the British s.

The class derives its name from bays in Canada and was designed by the RCN as a replacement for Second World War-era minesweepers. Fourteen were laid down in 1951–1952, however six were subsequently transferred to the French Navy in 1954. These ships were replaced by six of the same name in 1956–1957 but were assigned new pennant numbers.

They were reclassed in Canadian Forces service as patrol escorts in 1972 and six vessels remained in service until the late 1990s, providing coastal surveillance and shiphandling experience for junior officers with Maritime Forces Pacific.

Design and description
The class was designed with mahogany wood planking overlaying an aluminum frame and decks. They had a complement of 40.

The minesweepers were powered by two GM 12-cylinder diesel engines turning two shafts, creating . They carried 52 tons of oil. The ships were armed with one 40 mm/60 caliber Mk 7 gun.

Ships

Service history

Canadian service
Four vessels of the class were ordered in September 1949, followed by a further 10 in 1951 to replace the Second World War-era minesweepers. The second group of new construction was a result of Canada's entry into the Korean War. Initially ascribed the classification MCA they changed to MCB in 1954. In 1954, six ships, Chaleur, Chignecto, Cowichan, Fundy, Miramachi, and Thunder were transferred to the French Navy under the Mutual Aid Agreement of NATO due to a shortage of the type in allied navies. Chignecto, Cowichan, Fundy and Thunder were transferred on 7 April at Halifax, Nova Scotia with Chaleur and Miramichi on 9 October. Their names were reused for later vessels of the class. In 1958, four more, Comox, Gaspé, Trinity and Ungava,  were transferred to the Turkish Navy.

Chaleur, Fundy, Quinte and Thunder formed the First Minesweeping Squadron in 1960. In October 1960, Fundy, Thunder, Chaleur, Chignecto, Resolute and Quinte took part in the NATO naval exercise Sweep Clear V off Shelburne, Nova Scotia. The Second Minesweeping Squadron, comprising Fortune, Miramichi, Cowichan and James Bay made a port visit at Stockton, California in June 1960 before transiting into the Pacific. In May–June 1961, the First Canadian Minesweeping Squadron, composed of Chaleur, Chignecto, Fundy, Quinte, Resolute and Thunder, performed a tour of the Great Lakes, making several port visits.

In an effort to free up funding in the early 1960s for other capital projects, the remaining ten were placed in reserve. Four more of the class, Resolute, Quinte, James Bay and Fortune were paid off in 1964 and sold to commercial interests. Fortune was renamed Greenpeace Two and was used in an attempt to stop nuclear testing in the Aleutian Islands in 1971. In 1972, the six that remained were re-designated small patrol escorts with the classification PFL. In 1979 they were designated training ships with the classification PB. By 1980, they were part of the West Coast Training Squadron and they served with Training Group Pacific in the 1990s. They were discarded in the late 1990s with the second Chignecto the last to be paid off on 19 December 1998. In Canadian service they were replaced first by  until the new s were ready.

French naval service
In 1954 six ships were transferred to the French Navy and renamed Le Dieppoise (M 730), La Bayonnaise (M 728), La Malouine (M 727), La Dunkerquoise (M 726), La Lorientaise (M 731) and La Paimpolaise (M 729) respectively. The six vessels were transferred under the Mutual Defense Program. In the 1960s the six were modified for use as colonial patrol boats. Their minesweeping gear was removed and air conditioning installed. Their hull identification was changed to P 655, P 654, P 651, P 653, P 652, and P 657 respectively.

La Bayonnaise was stricken in 1976, followed by La Malouine in 1977. The remaining four were stationed in the Pacific until the 1980s when they were replaced by Super Patra-class patrol craft. In 1986 La Lorientaise and La Dunkerquoise were discarded and La Dieppoise and La Paimpolaise followed a year later.

Turkish naval service
In 1958, four Bay class were transferred to the Turkish Navy and renamed Tirebolu,  Trabzon, Terme and Tekirdag respectively. They were transferred under NATO mutual aid.

References

Citations

Sources

External links
 Bay class – hazegray.org

Mine warfare vessel classes
 
Ship classes of the French Navy